Uroš Račić (born 17 March 1998) is a Serbian professional footballer who plays as a defensive midfielder for Primeira Liga club Braga, on loan from La Liga club Valencia, and the Serbia national team.

Club career

Early years
Born in Kraljevo, Račić started playing football in local football academies "Bambi" and "Knjaz" along with his twin brother Bogdan. After three years paying with Altina football school in Zemun, twins returned to home town and joined Sloga Kraljevo. They also played with Sloboda Čačak before joined OFK Beograd. After two years he spent with youth team, Uroš was also licensed for the first team for the 2015–16 season. After he scored a goal for youth team in a match against Red Star Belgrade for 4:1 win, Uroš moved in opponent team with his twin brother and signed a three-year professional contract with Red Star on 13 March 2016.

Red Star Belgrade
Račić made his debut with Red Star Belgrade on 8 May 2016 in a friendly match against Olympiacos. On 14 May 2016, he made his SuperLiga debut in away match against Radnik Surdulica, coming on as a substitute for Aleksandar Katai.

During the 2017 summer pre-season, Račić was presented as one of the club's top 10 youth prospects. On 6 July 2017, Račić made his first continental appearance for the club, in the second leg of the first qualifying round for the 2017–18 UEFA Europa League, in a 3–3 draw against Floriana. Račić scored his first senior goal for Red Star Belgrade in a 3−1 victory against OFK Bačka on 13 August 2017. On the last day of the 2017 summer transfer window, Račić extended his contract with Red Star to 30 June 2021. He also scored in a 2–1 victory over Mladost Lučani in the 14th fixture of the Serbian SuperLiga campaign. His goal was proclaimed goal of the week in the domestic football competition, after which he won a wristwatch as a reward. On 5 May 2018, Račić was fouled for a penalty kick, which was scored by Dejan Joveljić in 4–0 home victory over Spartak Subotica. He scored and assisted teammate Nemanja Radonjić in the last season match against Voždovac on 19 May 2018.

Valencia
Račić joined Valencia in the summer of 2018 in a €2.2 million transfer from Red Star Belgrade. On 13 June 2018, he signed a four-year contract, but was assigned to the B-team in Segunda División B. A fixed-rate clause of €100 million was inserted in his contract.

2017–18 season
On 4 December 2018, Račić made his debut for Valencia in a 1–0 win over CD Ebro in the Copa del Rey.

Loans
On 14 January 2019, Račić was loaned to Segunda División side CD Tenerife until the end of the season. He was then loaned to Portuguese team FC Famalicão in August 2019.

2020–21 season
On 13 September 2020, Račić came on as a substitute in Valencia's opening game of the 2020–21 La Liga season home against Levante, in a 4–2 win.

International career
As a member of Serbia national under-18 football team Račić played several matches in 2016 and scored 1 goal against Armenia in a match played 15 March 2016. In August 2016, Račić was called into Serbia U19 squad for memorial tournament "Stevan Vilotić - Ćele", where he debuted in opening match against United States. Račić scored his first goal for U19 national team from a penalty kick, in a friendly match against Georgia, played on 8 October 2016. Račić was also a scorer in the last testing match before elite qualification round for the 2017 UEFA European Under-19 Championship, against Bosnia and Herzegovina on 9 March 2017. Račić got his first call in Serbian under-21 team by coach Goran Đorović in December 2017. He made his debut for the team in an away friendly against Qatar on 17 December 2017.

In November 2022, he was selected in Serbia's squad for the 2022 FIFA World Cup in Qatar, but he didn't make any appearance there.

Style of play

Standing at 6-foot-4-inches (1.93 m), Račić is a right-footed footballer. He joined Red Star Belgrade as a successor to Marko Grujić and player who usually plays on central midfield position, being capable of playing both attacking and defensive role equally. Račić also played as a centre-back in a friendly during the Miodrag Božović era. In August 2017, Račić was linked with Juventus, when he was also compared with Sergej Milinković-Savić. Račić emphasized Paul Pogba as his idol.

When it was announced about Račić's signing with Valencia, former player of the club, Predrag Mijatović, described Račić in Spanish media. He said he watched him against his former club, Partizan and mentioned Račić's physical characteristics. He also described his mode of play, but emphasized a difference in quality between the Serbian SuperLiga and La Liga.

Career statistics

Club

International

Honours
Red Star Belgrade
 Serbian SuperLiga: 2015–16, 2017–18

Valencia
 Copa del Rey: 2018–19

References

External links
 
 
 
 
 

1998 births
Living people
Sportspeople from Kraljevo
Serbian footballers
Serbia international footballers
Serbia under-21 international footballers
Serbia youth international footballers
Association football midfielders
OFK Beograd players
Red Star Belgrade footballers
Valencia CF Mestalla footballers
Valencia CF players
CD Tenerife players
F.C. Famalicão players
S.C. Braga players
Serbian SuperLiga players
La Liga players
Segunda División players
Segunda División B players
Primeira Liga players
Serbian expatriate footballers
Serbian expatriate sportspeople in Spain
Expatriate footballers in Spain
Serbian expatriate sportspeople in Portugal
Expatriate footballers in Portugal
2022 FIFA World Cup players